Aktepe is a town in the district of Hassa, Hatay Province, Turkey.

Geography 
The population was 8,385 as of 2012.

History 
Although there are ruins of ancients settlements around, the village of Aktepe was established in 1923. After a rapid increase in population, it was declared a township in 1972. The master plan of the town construction was completed in 1988.

Economy 
 
Cereals, cotton soybean and fruits are the main crops cultivated in the town. Aktepe is situated at the intersection of various villages roads, as well as the highway connecting Antakya to north. The transit trade of agricultural products is another economic activity. There are also three olive oil factories in the town.

References 

Populated places in Hatay Province
Towns in Turkey
Hassa District